NGC 89 is a  barred spiral or lenticular galaxy, part of Robert's Quartet, a group of four interacting galaxies. 

This member has a Seyfert 2 nucleus with extra-planar features emitting H-alpha radiation. There are filamentary features on each side of the disk, including a jet-like structure extending about 4 kpc in the NE direction. It may have lost its neutral hydrogen (H1) gas due to interactions with the other members of the clusters—most likely NGC 92.

References

External links
 
 NGC 89
 

0089
01374
Phoenix (constellation)
Robert's Quartet
Barred spiral galaxies
194-11
18340930